The Rotten Mile is the sixth album by Gallon Drunk, released October 22, 2007 on the Fred label.

Track listing

Personnel 
Gallon Drunk
Simon Wring – bass guitar, banjo
Terry Edwards – saxophone, muted trumpet
James Johnston – vocals, guitar, piano, organ, harmonica
Ian White – drums, maracas
Production and additional personnel
Noel Summerville – mastering
Tom Morris – production, engineering, mixing, recording

References 

2007 albums
Gallon Drunk albums